Barnegat Light may refer to:

Barnegat Light, New Jersey, a borough in New Jersey
Barnegat Lighthouse, a lighthouse in the borough of Barnegat Light